The Bundesliga, sometimes referred to as the Fußball-Bundesliga or 1. Bundesliga, is a professional association football league in Germany. At the top of the German football league system, the Bundesliga is Germany's primary football competition. The Bundesliga comprises 18 teams and operates on a system of promotion and relegation with the 2. Bundesliga. Seasons run from August to May. Games are played on Fridays, Saturdays and Sundays. All of the Bundesliga clubs take part in the DFB-Pokal cup competition . The winner of the Bundesliga qualifies for the DFL-Supercup.

Fifty-six clubs have competed in the Bundesliga since its founding. Bayern Munich has won 31 of 59 titles, as well as the last ten seasons. The Bundesliga has seen other champions, with Borussia Dortmund, Hamburger SV, Werder Bremen, Borussia Mönchengladbach, and VfB Stuttgart most prominent among them. The Bundesliga is one of the top national leagues, ranked third in Europe according to UEFA's league coefficient ranking for the current 2022–23 season, based on performances in European competitions over the past five seasons. The Bundesliga led the UEFA ranking from 1976 to 1984 and in 1990. It has also produced the continent's top-rated club seven times. Bundesliga clubs have won eight UEFA Champions League, seven UEFA Europa League, four European Cup Winners' Cup, two UEFA Super Cup, two FIFA Club World Cup, and three Intercontinental Cup titles. Its players have accumulated nine Ballon d'Or awards, two The Best FIFA Men's Player awards, four European Golden Shoe, and three UEFA Men's Player of the Year awards including UEFA Club Footballer of the Year.

The Bundesliga is the number one football league in the world in terms of average attendance; out of all sports, its average of 45,134 fans per game during the 2011–12 season was the second-highest of any sports league in the world after the American National Football League. The Bundesliga is broadcast on television in over 200 countries.

The Bundesliga was founded in 1962 in Dortmund and the first season started in 1963–64. The structure and organisation of the Bundesliga, along with Germany's other football leagues, have undergone frequent changes. The Bundesliga was founded by the Deutscher Fußball-Bund (English: German Football Association), but is now operated by the Deutsche Fußball Liga (English: German Football League).

Structure
The Bundesliga is composed of two divisions: the 1. Bundesliga (although it is rarely referred to with the First prefix), and, below that, the 2. Bundesliga (2nd Bundesliga), which has been the second tier of German football since 1974. The Bundesligen (plural) are professional leagues. Since 2008, the 3. Liga (3rd League) in Germany has also been a professional league, but may not be called Bundesliga because the league is run by the German Football Association (DFB) and not, as are the two Bundesligen, by the German Football League (DFL).

Below the level of the 3. Liga, leagues are generally subdivided on a regional basis. For example, the Regionalligen are currently made up of Nord (North), Nordost (Northeast), Süd (South), Südwest (Southwest) and West divisions. Below this are thirteen parallel divisions, most of which are called Oberligen (upper leagues) which represent federal states or large urban and geographical areas. The levels below the Oberligen differ between the local areas. The league structure has changed frequently and typically reflects the degree of participation in the sport in various parts of the country. In the early 1990s, changes were driven by the reunification of Germany and the subsequent integration of the national league of East Germany.

Every team in the two Bundesligen must have a licence to play in the league, or else they are relegated into the regional leagues. To obtain a licence, teams must be financially healthy and meet certain standards of conduct as organisations.

As in other national leagues, there are significant benefits to being in the top division:
A greater share of television broadcast licence revenues goes to 1. Bundesliga sides.
1. Bundesliga teams draw significantly greater levels of fan support. Average attendance in the first league is 42,673 per game—more than twice the average of the 2. Bundesliga.
Greater exposure through television and higher attendance levels helps 1. Bundesliga teams attract the most lucrative sponsorships.
1. Bundesliga teams develop substantial financial muscle through the combination of television and gate revenues, sponsorships and marketing of their team brands. This allows them to attract and retain skilled players from domestic and international sources and to construct first-class stadium facilities.

The 1. Bundesliga is financially strong, and the 2. Bundesliga has begun to evolve in a similar direction, becoming more stable organizationally and financially, and reflecting an increasingly higher standard of professional play.

Internationally, the most well-known German clubs include Bayern Munich, Borussia Dortmund, Schalke 04, RB Leipzig, Hamburger SV, VfB Stuttgart, 1. FC Köln, Borussia Mönchengladbach, Eintracht Frankfurt and Bayer Leverkusen. Hamburger SV was the only club to have played continuously in the Bundesliga since its foundation, until 12 May 2018, when the club was relegated for the first time.

In the 2008–09 season, the Bundesliga reinstated an earlier German system of promotion and relegation, which had been in use from 1981 until 1991:
 The bottom two finishers in the Bundesliga are automatically relegated to the 2. Bundesliga, with the top two finishers in the 2. Bundesliga taking their places.
 The third-from-bottom club in the Bundesliga will play a two-legged tie with the third-place team from the 2. Bundesliga, with the winner taking up the final place in the following season's Bundesliga.

From 1992 until 2008, a different system was used, in which the bottom three finishers of the Bundesliga had been automatically relegated, to be replaced by the top three finishers in the 2. Bundesliga. From 1963 until 1981 two, or later three, teams had been relegated from the Bundesliga automatically, while promotion had been decided either completely or partially in promotion play-offs.

The season starts in early August and lasts until late May, with a winter break of six weeks (mid-December through to the end of January). Starting with the 2021–22 season, kick off times have been changed with Friday matches starting at 8:30 pm, Saturdays at 3:30 pm and 6:30 pm, and Sundays at 3:30 pm, 5:30 pm and 7:30 pm.

History

Origins

Before the formation of the Bundesliga, German football was played at an amateur level in a large number of sub-regional leagues until, in 1949, part-time (semi-) professionalism was introduced and only five regional Oberligen (Premier Leagues) remained. Regional champions and runners-up played a series of playoff matches for the right to compete in a final game for the national championship. On 28 January 1900, a national association, the Deutscher Fußball Bund (DFB) had been founded in Leipzig with 86 member clubs. The first recognised national championship team was VfB Leipzig, who beat DFC Prague 7–2 in a game played at Altona on 31 May 1903.

Through the 1950s, there were continued calls for the formation of a central professional league, especially as professional leagues in other countries began to draw Germany's best players away from the semi-professional domestic leagues. At the international level, the German game began to falter as German teams often fared poorly against professional teams from other countries. A key supporter of the central league concept was national team head coach Sepp Herberger who said, "If we want to remain competitive internationally, we have to raise our expectations at the national level."

Meanwhile, in East Germany, a separate league was established with the formation of the DS-Oberliga (Deutscher Sportausschuss Oberliga) in 1950. The league was renamed the Football Oberliga DFV in 1958 and was generally referred to simply as the DDR-Liga or DDR-Oberliga. The league fielded 14 teams with two relegation spots.

Foundation
 

The defeat of the national team by Yugoslavia (0–1) in a 1962 World Cup quarter-final game in Chile was one impetus (of many) towards the formation of a national league. At the annual DFB convention under new DFB president Hermann Gösmann (elected that very day) the Bundesliga was created in Dortmund at the Westfalenhallen on 28 July 1962 to begin play starting with the 1963–64 season.

At the time, there were five Oberligen (premier leagues) in place representing West Germany's North, South, West, Southwest, and Berlin. East Germany, behind the Iron Curtain, maintained its separate league structure. 46 clubs applied for admission to the new league. 16 teams were selected based on their success on the field, economic criteria and representation of the various Oberligen.
From Oberliga Nord: Eintracht Braunschweig, Werder Bremen, Hamburger SV
From Oberliga West: Borussia Dortmund, 1. FC Köln, Meidericher SV (now MSV Duisburg), Preußen Münster, Schalke 04
From Oberliga Südwest: 1. FC Kaiserslautern, 1. FC Saarbrücken
From Oberliga Süd: Eintracht Frankfurt, Karlsruher SC, 1. FC Nürnberg, 1860 Munich, VfB Stuttgart
From Oberliga Berlin: Hertha BSC

The first Bundesliga games were played on 24 August 1963. Early favourite 1. FC Köln was the first Bundesliga champion (with 45:15 points) over second place clubs Meidericher SV and Eintracht Frankfurt (both 39:21).

Reunification
Following German reunification, the East German leagues were merged into the West German system. Dynamo Dresden and FC Hansa Rostock were seeded into the top-tier Bundesliga division, with other clubs being sorted into lower tiers.

Competition format

The German football champion is decided strictly by play in the Bundesliga. Each club plays every other club once at home and once away. Originally, a victory was worth two points, with one point for a draw and none for a loss. Since the 1995–96 season, a victory has been worth three points, while a draw remains worth a single point, and zero points are given for a loss. The club with the most points at the end of the season becomes German champion. Currently, the top four clubs in the table qualify automatically for the group phase of the UEFA Champions League. The two teams at the bottom of the table are relegated into the 2. Bundesliga, while the top two teams in the 2. Bundesliga are promoted. The 16th-placed team (third-last), and the third-placed team in the 2. Bundesliga play a two-leg play-off match. The winner of this match plays the next season in the Bundesliga, and the loser in the 2. Bundesliga.

If teams are level on points, tie-breakers are applied in the following order:
Goal difference for the entire season
Total goals scored for the entire season
Head-to-head results (total points)
Head-to-head goals scored
Head-to-head away goals scored
Total away goals scored for the entire season

If two clubs are still tied after all of these tie-breakers have been applied, a single match is held at a neutral site to determine the placement. However, this has never been necessary in the history of the Bundesliga.

In terms of team selection, matchday squads must have no more than five non-EU representatives. Nine substitutes are permitted to be selected, from which three can be used in the duration of the game.

Changes in league structure
Number of teams:
 1963–64 to 1964–65: 16
 1965–66 to 1990–91: 18
 1991–92: 20, while the East German league was being included after German reunification
 Since 1992–93: 18
Number of teams relegated (automatic relegation except as noted):
 1963–64 to 1973–74: 2
 1974–75 to 1980–81: 3
 1981–82 to 1990–91: 2 automatic plus the 16th-place team in the First Bundesliga played a two-leg relegation match against the third-place team of the Second Bundesliga for the final spot in the First Bundesliga
 1991–92: 4
 1992–93 to 2007–08: 3
 Since 2008–09: 2 automatic plus the 16th-place team in the First Bundesliga playing a two-leg relegation match against the third-place team of the Second Bundesliga for the final spot in the First Bundesliga

Qualification for European competitions
1st, 2nd, 3rd, and 4th place: Group stage of UEFA Champions League
5th place: Group stage of UEFA Europa League
6th place: Third qualifying round of Europa League
Until the 2016–17 season, an additional place in the Europa League could also be granted via the UEFA Fair Play mechanism. This rule was maintained from the UEFA Cup. The last Bundesliga team to gain entry to the UEFA Cup via the fair play rule was Mainz 05 in 2005–06.
DFB-Pokal (German Cup) winner: Qualifies for group stage of Europa League regardless of league position.
Until 2015–16, if the Cup winner qualified for the Champions League, the cup winner's place in the Europa League went to the defeated cup finalist if it had not already qualified for European competition, although the defeated cup finalist would enter the competition a stage earlier than if it had won the Cup. This rule was retained from the Europa League's predecessor, the UEFA Cup. From 2015 to 2016, the runners-up no longer qualify for the Europa League and the Europa League berth reserved for the DFB-Pokal winners is transferred to the highest finisher below the Champions League qualification places.
 Prior to 2015–16, the team that benefited from that rule did not necessarily have to be a Bundesliga member. For example, although 2. Bundesliga sides Alemannia Aachen lost to Werder Bremen in the 2004 DFB-Pokal Final, Alemannia secured an entry in the 2004–05 UEFA Cup, because Werder qualified for the Champions League as First Bundesliga champions.

The number of German clubs which may participate in UEFA competitions is determined by UEFA coefficients, which take into account the results of a particular nation's clubs in UEFA competitions over the preceding five years.

History of European qualification
European Cup/Champions League:
 Up to and including 1996–97: German champion only.
 1997–99: Top two teams; champions automatically into group phase, runners-up entered the qualifying round.
 1999–2008: Top two teams automatically into first group phase (only one group phase starting in 2003–04). Depending on the DFB's UEFA coefficients standing, either one or two other clubs (most recently one) entered at the third qualifying round; winners at this level entered the group phase.
 2008–11: Top two teams automatically into group phase. Third placed team had to play in the play-off round for the right to play in the group stage.
UEFA Cup/Europa League:
 From 1971–72 to 1998–99, UEFA member nations could send between one and four teams to the UEFA Cup. Germany was always entitled to send at least three teams to the competition and often as many as four. From 1978–79, the number of participants was determined by the DFB's UEFA coefficient standing, prior to this the method for deciding the number of participants is unknown. The best performing teams in the league other than the champion would qualify, although if one of these teams was also winner of the DFB-Pokal then they would enter the Cup Winners' Cup instead and their UEFA Cup place would be taken by the next highest-placed team in the league (5th or 6th place). Briefly in the mid-1970s the DFB decided to allocate the last UEFA Cup place to the DFB-Pokal runner-up instead of a third or fourth team qualified by performance in the league, meaning that at this point the DFB-Pokal qualified two teams for European competition (winners for the Cup Winners' Cup, runners-up for the UEFA Cup). This policy was unique amongst UEFA member associations and was dropped after only a few seasons. Starting with the 1999–2000 season and the abolition of the Cup Winners' Cup (which was then folded into the UEFA Cup), the DFB-Pokal winner now automatically qualified for the UEFA Cup alongside, depending on the DFB's UEFA coefficients standing, between one and three extra participants (if the DFB-Pokal winner also qualified for the Champions League, they were replaced by the DFB-Pokal runner-up; if they were also qualified for the Champions League, the UEFA Cup place went to the next best placed team in the league not otherwise qualified for European competition). Since 1999, the DFB has always been entitled to enter a minimum of three clubs in the UEFA Cup/Europa League, and at times as many as four (the maximum for any European federation). Teams that entered via UEFA's Fair Play mechanism, or those that entered through the now-defunct Intertoto Cup, did not count against the national quota. From 2006 through the final Intertoto Cup in 2008, only one First Bundesliga side was eligible to enter the Intertoto Cup and possibly earn a UEFA Cup berth. For the 2005–06 season, the DFB earned an extra UEFA Cup place via the Fair Play draw; this place went to Mainz 05 as the highest-ranked club in the Fair Play table of the First Bundesliga not already qualified for Europe.
Cup Winners' Cup (abolished after 1999):
 The winner of the DFB-Pokal entered the Cup Winners' Cup, unless that team was also league champion and therefore competing in the European Cup/Champions League, in which case their place in the Cup Winners' Cup was taken by the DFB-Pokal runner-up. Today, the DFB-Pokal winner (if not otherwise qualified for the Champions League) enters the UEFA Europa League.

Clubs

Members for 2022–23

Business model
In the 2009–10 season the Bundesliga's turnover was €1.7bn, broken down into match-day revenue (€424m), sponsorship receipts (€573m) and broadcast income (€594m). That year it was the only European football league where clubs collectively made a profit. Bundesliga clubs paid less than 50% of revenue in players wages, the lowest percentage out of the European leagues. The Bundesliga has the lowest ticket prices and the highest average attendance among Europe's five major leagues.

Bundesliga clubs tend to form close associations with local firms, several of which have since grown into big global companies; in a comparison of leading Bundesliga and Premiership clubs, Bayern Munich received 55% of its revenue from company sponsorship deals, while Manchester United got 37%.

By contrast, in the other major European leagues numerous high-profile teams have come under ownership of foreign billionaires and a significant number of clubs have high levels of debt.

Exceptions to the 50+1 rule allow Bayer Leverkusen, TSG 1899 Hoffenheim, and VfL Wolfsburg to be owned by corporations or individual investors. In the cases of Bayer Leverkusen and Wolfsburg, the clubs were founded by major corporations (respectively Bayer AG and Volkswagen) as sports clubs for their employees, while Hoffenheim has long received its primary support from SAP co-founder Dietmar Hopp, who played in the club's youth system.

After 2000 the German Football Association and the Bundesliga required every club to run a youth academy with the aim of developing local talent for the club and the national team. As of 2010 the Bundesliga and second Bundesliga spend €75m a year on these youth academies, which train five thousand players aged 12–18. This increased the percentage of under-23-year-olds in the Bundesliga from 6% in 2000 to 15% in 2010. This in turn allows more money to be spent on the smaller number of players that are bought.

In the 2000s, the Bundesliga was regarded as competitive, as five teams won the league title. This contrasted with the English Premier League, then dominated by a "Big Four" (Manchester United, Chelsea, Liverpool, and Arsenal), as well as France's Ligue 1, won seven consecutive years by Lyon. In the second decade, however, a resurgent Bayern Munich has won each year from 2013 to 2021 onward.

Financial regulations
For a number of years, the clubs in the Bundesliga have been subject to regulations not unlike the UEFA Financial Fair Play Regulations agreed upon in September 2009.

At the end of each season, clubs in the Bundesliga must apply to the German Football Federation (DFB) for a licence to participate again the following year; only when the DFB, who have access to all transfer documents and accounts, are satisfied that there is no threat of insolvency do they give approval. The DFB have a system of fines and points deductions for clubs who flout rules and those who go into the red can only buy a player after selling one for at least the same amount. In addition, no individual is allowed to own more than 49 per cent of any Bundesliga club, the only exceptions being VfL Wolfsburg, Bayer Leverkusen and current 3. Liga member FC Carl Zeiss Jena should they ever be promoted to the Bundesliga as they were each founded as factory teams.

Despite the good economic governance, there have still been some instances of clubs getting into difficulties. In 2004, Borussia Dortmund reported a debt of €118.8 million (£83 million). Having won the Champions League in 1997 and a number of Bundesliga titles, Dortmund had gambled on maintaining their success with an expensive group of largely foreign players but failed, narrowly escaping liquidation in 2006. In subsequent years, the club went through extensive restructuring to return to financial health, largely with young home-grown players. In 2004 Hertha BSC reported debts of £24.7 million and were able to continue in the Bundesliga only after proving they had long term credit with their bank.

The leading German club Bayern Munich made a net profit of just €2.5 million in 2008–09 season (group accounts), while Schalke 04 made a net loss of €30.4 million in 2009 financial year. Borussia Dortmund GmbH & Co. KGaA, made a net loss of just €2.9 million in 2008–09 season.

Attendances

Based on its per-game average, the Bundesliga is the best-attended association football league in the world; out of all sports, its average of 45,116 fans per game during the 2011–12 season was the second highest of any professional sports league worldwide, behind only the National Football League of the United States. Bundesliga club Borussia Dortmund has the highest average attendance of any football club in the world.

Out of Europe's five major football leagues (Premier League, La Liga, Ligue 1, and Serie A ), the Bundesliga has the lowest ticket prices and the highest average attendance. Many club stadia have large terraced areas for standing fans (by comparison, stadia in the English Premier League are all-seaters due to the Taylor Report). Teams limit the number of season tickets to ensure everyone has a chance to see the games live, and the away club has the right to 10% of the available capacity. Match tickets often double as free rail passes which encourages supporters to travel and celebrate in a relaxed atmosphere. According to Bundesliga chief executive Christian Seifert, tickets are inexpensive (especially for standing room) as "It is not in the clubs' culture so much [to raise prices]. They are very fan orientated". Uli Hoeneß, president of Bayern Munich, was quoted as saying "We do not think the fans are like cows to be milked. Football has got to be for everybody."

The spectator figures for league for the last ten seasons:

Media coverage

Domestic
The Bundesliga TV, radio, internet, and mobile broadcast rights are distributed by DFL Sports Enterprises, a subsidiary of the Deutsche Fußball Liga. The Bundesliga broadcast rights are sold along with the broadcast rights to the relegation playoffs, 2. Bundesliga and DFL-Supercup.

From 2017 to 2018 to 2018–19, Bundesliga matches were broadcast on TV in Germany on Sky Deutschland and Eurosport. Prior to the 2019–20 season, Eurosport sublicensed its broadcast rights to sports streaming service DAZN, which will broadcast games previously allocated to Eurosport until the conclusion of the 2020–21 season. Three Friday night matches – the openers of the first and second halves of the season, and on the final matchday before the winter break – are broadcast to all Germans on Sat. 1.

Starting with the 2018–19 season, Sky began arranging simulcasts of high-profile Saturday games on free TV to promote its coverage of the league. The April 2019 Revierderby was broadcast on Das Erste, and two additional games during the 2019–20 season were broadcast on ZDF.

Radio coverage includes the national Konferenz (whip-around coverage) on the stations of ARD and full match coverage on local radio stations.

Global
 

The Bundesliga is broadcast on TV in over 200 countries. ESPN has held rights in the United States since the beginning of the 2020–21 season. 4 matches per season are reserved for linear television with the rest appearing on ESPN+. In Canada, broadcast rights were sub-licensed to Sportsnet and Sportsnet World.

In the United Kingdom and in Ireland, the Bundesliga is broadcast live on Sky Sports. In Spain, the Bundesliga is broadcast live on Movistar+.

In 2015, digital TV operator StarTimes acquired exclusive television rights for Sub-Saharan Africa for five years starting from 2015 to 2016 season.

Champions

In total, 43 clubs have won the German championship, including titles won before the Bundesliga's inception and those in the East German Oberliga. The record champions are Bayern Munich with 31 titles, ahead of BFC Dynamo with 10 (all in the DDR-Oberliga) and 1. FC Nürnberg with 9.

Performance by club
Clubs in bold currently play in the top division.

Honours

In 2004, the honour of "Verdiente Meistervereine" (roughly "distinguished champion clubs") was introduced, following a custom first practised in Italy to recognise sides that have won three or more championships since 1963 by the display of gold stars on their team badges and jerseys. Each country's usage is unique, with the following rules applying in Germany:
3 Bundesliga titles: 1 star
5 Bundesliga titles: 2 stars
10 Bundesliga titles: 3 stars
20 Bundesliga titles: 4 stars
30 Bundesliga titles: 5 stars

The former East German side BFC Dynamo laid claim to the three stars of a 10-time champion. The club asked for equal rights and petitioned the DFL and  the DFB to have their DDR-Oberliga titles recognised. BFC Dynamo received support from SG Dynamo Dresden and 1. FC Magdeburg in its attempts to achieve recognition for East German titles. The DFL eventually answered that it was not the responsible body and pointed to the DFB, but the DFB remained silent for long time. BFC Dynamo eventually took matters into their own hands and emblazoned its jerseys with three stars, while a decision was still pending. This caused some debate because the club had been the favourite club of Erich Mielke during the East German era. There were rumours that the ten titles won by the club were also due to alleged manipulation of the game by Erich Mielke, while there is no proof that referees stood under direct instructions from the Stasi and no document has ever been found in the archives that gave the Stasi a mandate to bribe referees. Critics in the DFB environment pointed to politically influenced championships in East Germany. BFC Dynamo had been supported by the Stasi and had been advantaged. The club had enjoyed privileged access to talents and access to a permanent training camp at Uckley in Königs Wusterhausen. However, also other clubs in East Germany had enjoyed similar advantages, which put the DFB in a difficult situation. Additionally, former East German referee and CDU parliamentarian Bernd Heynemann spoke out for recognition of all East German titles. The issue of recognition for titles outside the Bundesliga also affected pre-Bundesliga champions, such as Hertha BSC. The DFB finally decided in November 2005 to allow all former champions to display a single star inscribed with the number of titles, including all German men's titles since 1903, women's titles since 1974 and East German titles.

The DFB format only applies to teams playing below the Bundesliga (below the top two divisions), since the DFL conventions apply in the Bundesliga. Greuther Fürth unofficially display three (silver) stars for pre-war titles in spite of being in the Bundesliga. These stars are a permanent part of their crest. However, Fürth has to leave the stars out of their jersey.

Since June 2010, the following clubs have been officially allowed to wear stars while playing in the Bundesliga. The number in parentheses is for Bundesliga titles won.

     Bayern Munich (31)
  Borussia Dortmund (5)
  Borussia Mönchengladbach (5)
 Werder Bremen (4)
 Hamburger SV (3)
 VfB Stuttgart (3)

In addition, a system of one star designation was adopted for use. This system is intended to take into account not only Bundesliga titles but also other (now defunct) national championships. As of July 2014, the following clubs are allowed to wear one star while playing outside the Bundesliga. The number in parentheses is for total league championships won over the course of German football history, and would be displayed within the star. Some teams listed here had different names while winning their respective championships, these names are also noted in parentheses.

 Bayern Munich* (31)
 BFC Dynamo (10)
 1. FC Nürnberg** (9)
 Borussia Dortmund* (8)
 Dynamo Dresden*** (8)
 Schalke 04* (7)
 Hamburger SV** (7) (1921–22, Title declined per DFB)
 1. FC Frankfurt (as ASK Vorwärts Berlin and FC Vorwärts Berlin in the DDR-Oberliga) (6)
 VfB Stuttgart* (5)
 Borussia Mönchengladbach* (5)
 Werder Bremen* (4)
 1. FC Kaiserslautern** (4)
 FC Erzgebirge Aue*** (include 1955 DDR-Oberliga unofficial fall championship) (as SC Wismut Karl-Marx-Stadt) (4)
 FC Carl Zeiss Jena (3)

 1. FC Köln* (3)
 1. FC Lokomotive Leipzig (as VfB Leipzig) (3)
 1. FC Magdeburg** (3)
 Greuther Fürth** (3)
 Hertha BSC* (2)
 FC Viktoria 1889 Berlin (as Berliner TuFC Viktoria 89)*** (2)
 FC Rot-Weiß Erfurt (as BSG Turbine Erfurt and SC Turbine Erfurt in the DDR-Oberliga) (2)
 Dresdner SC (2)
 BSG Chemie Leipzig (as BSG Chemie Leipzig in the DDR-Oberliga) (2)
 Hannover 96** (2)
 FSV Zwickau*** (as ZSG Horch Zwickau in the DDR-Oberliga) (2)
 Turbine Halle (as BSG Turbine Halle in the DDR-Oberliga) (2)
 Hansa Rostock** (in the DDR-Oberliga) (1)

 Karlsruher FV (1)
 Holstein Kiel** (1)
 1860 Munich*** (1)
 Blau Weiss Berlin (as SpVgg Blau-Weiß 1890 Berlin) (1)
 Karlsruher SC** (1)
 Fortuna Düsseldorf** (1)
 Eintracht Frankfurt* (1)
 VfL Wolfsburg* (1)
 Chemnitzer FC (as FC Karl-Marx-Stadt in the DDR-Oberliga) (1)
 Freiburger FC (1)
 VfR Mannheim (1)
 Rot-Weiss Essen*** (1)
 Eintracht Braunschweig** (1)

* 
** 
***

Logo history
For the first time in 1996, the Bundesliga was given its own logo to distinguish itself. Six years later, the logo was revamped into a portrait orientation, which was used until 2010. A new logo was announced for the 2010–11 season in order to modernise the brand logo for all media platforms. To celebrate the 50th anniversary of the Bundesliga, a special logo was developed for the 2012–13 season, featuring a "50" and "1963–2013". Following the season, the 2010 logo was restored. In December 2016, it was announced that a new logo would be used for the 2017–18 season, modified slightly for digitisation requirements, featuring a matte look.

Influence and criticism
The Dutch football schools, which existed and developed the Netherlands into one of Europe and the world's major football forces, have been strongly influenced and galvanised with German football philosophy, in particular by experiences of Dutch players and managers in Bundesliga. Former England international Owen Hargreaves hailed the Bundesliga alongside Pep Guardiola for its positive impact on nurturing young talents, noting that the Bundesliga is the best league in the world to promote young footballers. Many young English talents have sought refuge in Germany in order to regain fitness and football skills. Outside Europe, the J.League of Japan, which was founded in 1992, was strongly influenced by the philosophy of the Bundesliga. Since then, the J.League has managed to establish itself as one of the best football leagues in Asia, in which it shares a beneficial relationship with its German counterpart.

The Bundesliga has earned praise for its reputation on good financial management and the physical fitness of players.

The Bundesliga outperformed the English Premier League in 2017 in online influence in China, having been accredited for its open embrace of live-streaming and fast-forward visions.

The Bundesliga has at times been criticised for a perceived lack of competitiveness due to the continued dominance of FC Bayern Munich. The club has won a record 31 titles (of 59 available) in the modern Bundesliga era since 1963; a greater level of success than that of all their rivals combined. Indeed, the Bavarian club has won every consecutive title since the 2011–12 season. Former Germany international Stefan Effenberg has suggested that the league be restructured in order to end Bayern's dominance.

Records

Appearances

Top scorers

See also
 DFL (operator of the league)
 Promotion to the Bundesliga
 All-time Bundesliga table
 List of foreign Bundesliga players
 List of football clubs in Germany by major honours won
 List of attendance figures at domestic professional sports leagues – the Bundesliga in a worldwide context
 German football clubs in European competitions
 UAE German Supercup
 90elf – defunct German internet radio station that covered Bundesliga matches

References

External links

 
DFB – Deutscher Fußball Bund (German Football Association) 

 
Germany
Professional sports leagues in Germany
1963 establishments in West Germany
Sports leagues established in 1963
1
Organisations based in Frankfurt